Illana Bay, also known as the Iranun Bay, is a large bay of the Moro Gulf, off the southwestern coast of Mindanao island in the Philippines.

Illana Bay and Moro Gulf form part of the Celebes Sea.

See also
Sibuguey Bay — also of Moro Gulf

Bays of the Philippines
Bodies of water of the Celebes Sea
Landforms of Zamboanga del Sur
Landforms of Lanao del Norte
Landforms of Lanao del Sur
Landforms of Maguindanao del Norte